Weidmann is a German surname meaning "hunter". Notable people with the surname include:

Eugen Weidmann (1908–1939), German convict who was the last to be publicly executed in France
Jens Weidmann (born 1968), president of Deutsche Bundesbank
Jozef Weidmann (1899–1962), Dutch-Surinamese Catholic priest, politician and union leader
Karl Weidmann (born 1931), Swiss rower
Manfred Weidmann (born 1945) German footballer
Moritz Georg Weidmann (1686–1743), German publisher and bookseller, son of the Elder
Chris Weidman (born 1984), former World Champion in Mixed Martial Arts - UFC Middleweight Champion.

See also 
Weidmann's Restaurant, a restaurant in Meridian, Mississippi owned since 1870 by the Swiss-born Felix Weidmann and his family
Weidemann
Weidman
Weideman

German-language surnames
Occupational surnames